William Asahel Shurcliff (March 27, 1909 – June 20, 2006) was an American physicist.

Biography

He received his BA cum laude in 1930, a PhD in Physics in 1934, and a degree in Business Administration in 1935, all from Harvard University. In the 1930s he worked at the Spectrophotometric Laboratory at the Calco Chemical Division of the American Cyanamid Company.

Atomic bomb
In 1942 he joined the staff of the Office of Scientific Research and Development, where he worked in the Liaison Office, processing technical information obtained from overseas and routing it to divisions within US government research where it could be useful. In May 1942 he was chosen by his boss, Vannevar Bush, to be part of S-1 Section, which would become the Manhattan Project to make the atomic bomb. Shurcliff's role was specifically to be a censor of patents: he would review patent applications from the private sector which appeared to impinge on topics being developed in secret by the government, and put them under temporary secrecy orders. As he put it, his job was to "locate, examine, and make secret all non-gov’t-controlled U.S. patent applications related to S-1 (the atomic bomb)." Through October 1944, he "put to sleep" (as he put it) at least 131 patent applications from 95 separate inventors.

He later served as an assistant to Richard Tolman, another physicist working on the Manhattan Project, helping to copyedit the Smyth Report, the first official history of the Manhattan Project. In 1946, he serve as the official historian to Operation Crossroads, the first postwar nuclear test series.

In the late 1940s, he worked for Polaroid Corporation, where "he worked extensively in optics, held more than 20 patents and refined the automatic-focus slide projector."

Polarized light
In 1962 Harvard University Press published Polarized Light: Production and Use which made an extensive review of the subject and included thirty pages of enumerative bibliography. Two years later The Commission on College Physics teamed Shurcliff with Stanley S. Ballard to write a text on polarized light suitable for college study. The bibliography was reduced to a single page and a reviewer noted the "straightforward, conversational style" and that "The treatment is mostly nonmathematical but touches on electromagnetic theory, the Poincaré sphere, Stokes vectors and Mueller matrices with great clarity." The bibliography was later republished in an anthology.

Opposition to supersonic passenger planes
He "went on to play an outspoken role in defeating plans for a supersonic passenger plane in the 1960s, while working as a senior research associate at the Cambridge Electron Accelerator. He co-founded the Citizens' League Against the Sonic Boom, and was a member of the advisory committee to the Anti-Concorde Project. "Shurcliff, as much as anyone in the United States, deserves credit for making it politically impossible to fly SST's over populated areas."

Passive solar building design
In the 1970s and 1980s, he became an advocate for passive solar building design and superinsulation.

Defense
He opposed the Strategic Defense Initiative.

Bibliography 
 1947: Bombs at Bikini: the official report of Operation Crossroads, W. H. Wise via Biodiversity Heritage Library
 1955: "Haidinger's Brushes and Circularly Polarized Light", Journal of the Optical Society of America 45(5):399.
 1962: Polarized Light: Production and Use via Internet Archive
 1964: (with Stanley S. Ballard) Polarized Light, Van Nostrand Momentum Book (for the Commission on College Physics)
 1970: SST and Sonic Boom Handbook, Ballantine Books.
 1978: Solar Heated Buildings of North America: 120 Outstanding Examples, Brick House Publishing.
 1979: New Inventions in Low Cost Solar Heating: 100 Daring Schemes Tried and Untried, Brick House Publishing.
 1981: Super Insulated Houses and Double Envelope Houses: A Survey of Principles and Practice, Brick House Publishing.

References

External links

1909 births
2006 deaths
Manhattan Project people
Harvard University alumni
20th-century American physicists
Harvard Business School alumni